Miss Universe 2023 will be the 72nd Miss Universe pageant to be held on late 2023 in El Salvador. R'Bonney Gabriel of the United States will crown her successor at the end of the event.

Background

Location and date

On 14 January 2023, Salvadoran president Nayib Bukele announced that this edition will be held in El Salvador before the end of 2023, the last time it was hosted in 1975, making the return of hosting the event in Latin America since 2011.

Selection of participants
Contestants from five countries and territories have been selected to compete in the competition. One of these delegates was appointed to the position after being a runner-up of their national pageant or being selected through a casting process.

This edition will see the debut of  Pakistan.

From this edition onwards, the Miss Universe Organization will officially accept married women and women with children to compete in the pageant.

Contestants
As of 19 March 2023, 5 contestants have been confirmed:

Upcoming pageants

Notes

References

External links
 

2023
Universe
2023 in El Salvador